Glenea thomsoni is a species of beetle in the family Cerambycidae. It was described by Francis Polkinghorne Pascoe in 1867. It is known from Moluccas.

Varietas
 Glenea thomsoni var. apiceinvittata Breuning, 1956
 Glenea thomsoni var. lunulofasciata Pic, 1943
 Glenea thomsoni var. ochreocirculata Breuning, 1956

References

thomsoni
Beetles described in 1867